Parazoanthidae is a family of cnidarians.

Genera include:
 Antipathozoanthus Sinniger, Reimer & Pawlowski, 2010
 Bergia Duchassaing & Michelotti, 1860
 Bullagummizoanthus Sinniger, Ocaña & Baco, 2013
 Churabana gen. nov.
 Corallizoanthus Reimer in Reimer Nonaka Sinniger & Iwase, 2008
 Hurlizoanthus Sinniger, Ocaña & Baco, 2013
 Isozoanthus Carlgren, 1905
 Kauluzoanthus Sinniger, Ocaña & Baco, 2013
 Kulamanamana Sinniger, Ocaña & Baco, 2013
 Mesozoanthus Sinniger & Haussermann, 2009
 Parazoanthus Haddon & Shackleton, 1891
 Savalia Nardo, 1814 (synonym: Gerardia)
 Umimayanthus Montenegro, Sinniger & Reimer, 2015
 Vitrumanthus gen. nov.
 Zibrowius Sinniger, Ocaña & Baco, 2013

References

 
Macrocnemina